Airway obstruction is a blockage of respiration in the airway that hinders the free flow of air. It can be broadly classified into being either in the upper airway (UPA) or lower airway (LOA). 

Airway obstruction is a life-threatening condition and requires urgent attention, and assistance when it is needed. The assistance to clear an upper airway obstruction would begin employing first-aid anti-choking techniques.

Upper airway obstruction

Causes of upper airway obstruction include foreign body aspiration, blunt laryngotracheal trauma, penetrating laryngotracheal trauma, tonsillar hypertrophy, paralysis of the vocal cord or vocal fold, acute laryngotracheitis such as viral croup, bacterial tracheitis, epiglottitis, peritonsillar abscess, pertussis, retropharyngeal abscess, spasmodic croup. In basic and advanced life support airway obstructions are often referred to as A-problems. Management of airways relies on both minimal-invasive and invasive techniques.

Lower airway obstruction

Lower airway obstruction is mainly caused by increased resistance in the bronchioles (usually from a decreased radius of the bronchioles) that reduces the amount of air inhaled in each breath and the oxygen that reaches the pulmonary arteries. It is different from airway restriction (which prevents air from diffusing into the pulmonary arteries because of some kind of blockage in the lungs). Diseases that cause lower airway obstruction are termed obstructive lung diseases.

Lower airway obstruction can be measured using spirometry. A decreased FEV1/FVC ratio (versus the normal of about 80%) is indicative of airway obstruction, as the normal amount of air can no longer be exhaled in the first second of expiration. An airway restriction would not produce a reduced FEV1/FVC ratio, but would reduce the vital capacity.  The ventilation is therefore affected leading to a ventilation-perfusion mismatch and hypoxia.

Consequences 

Airway obstruction may cause obstructive pneumonitis or post-obstructive pneumonitis. It can also be a sign of chronic obstructive pulmonary disease (COPD), a common breathing disorder that is a risk factor for lung cancer.

See also
 Stridor
 Recurrent airway obstruction

References

External links 

Symptoms and signs: Respiratory system